Coramark Inc. (doing business as Cora) is a Canadian chain of casual restaurants serving breakfast and lunch. Until 2008, the chain was known as Chez Cora déjeuners... in Quebec, and now just Cora elsewhere in Canada. Franchises are located in all provinces.

Chez Cora began in 1987 when Cora Tsouflidou opened a snack bar in Montreal, Quebec, Canada. It is now a chain of more than 50 franchises in Quebec and 130 across Canada.

Events
On March 8, 2017, Cora's president, Nicholas Tsouflidou, was kidnapped at gunpoint from his home near Montreal by an unidentified man. Tsouflidis was found the next day unharmed in Laval.

See also
List of Canadian restaurant chains

References

External links
Official website

Companies based in Quebec
Restaurant chains in Canada
Restaurant franchises
Restaurants established in 1987
1987 establishments in Quebec
Sainte-Thérèse, Quebec